Neha Kapur (born 31 March 1984) is an Indian model, actress, and former beauty queen who won Femina Miss India in 2006 and represented India at the Miss Universe pageant that year. She is married to Kunal Nayyar.

Early life
Kapur was born in New Delhi to a Punjabi Hindu family. She learned classical dance forms when she was very young. She has four years of training in Bharatanatyam and eight years in Kathak. Kapur holds a degree in fashion design from the Pearl Academy.

Career
In addition to winning the Femina Miss India Universe 2006 crown, Kapur also won the Femina Miss Fresh Face and Femina Miss Photogenic awards in the pageant.

Kapur represented India at the Miss Universe 2006 pageant held on 23 July in Los Angeles. She made the semifinals to the top 20.

Personal life
In December 2011, Kapur married British actor Kunal Nayyar, who is best known for his portrayal of Rajesh Koothrappali in the TV comedy series The Big Bang Theory.

References

External links
 Neha Kapur's Official Myspace Page

 

Living people
Female models from Delhi
Femina Miss India winners
Miss Universe 2006 contestants
1984 births